The Western Somali Liberation Front (abbreviated WSLF) was a separatist rebel group fighting in eastern Ethiopia to create an independent state. It played a major role in the Ogaden War of 1977-78 assisting the invading Somali Army.

History
Somali guerrilla activity in the Ogaden and in the Haud area east of Harar flared sporadically after Somalia gained independence in 1960. Guerrilla activity remained essentially a police concern until the  1964 Ethiopian–Somali Border War erupted. When Siad Barre seized power in Mogadishu in 1969, he thwarted attempts at an understanding between Ethiopia and Somalia. He pledged to renew efforts to establish Greater Somalia that would encompass about one-third of Ethiopia's territory. Encouraged by the breakdown of authority in Addis Ababa after the 1974 overthrow of Haile Selassie, Somalia provided equipment, as well as moral and organizational support to insurgent movements in the Ogaden and southern Ethiopia.

The WSLF was founded by a young captain called Yusuf Dheere Mohamed Sugaal  (Yuusuf the tall man) who was educated and trained in Syria, after finishing high school in Hargeisa. Upon his return from Syria, Yusuf Dheere has created the Ururka Dhalinyara Soomaali Galbeed or the Western Somali Youth Organization. Yusuf Dheere, who was well connected and from a noble family, met the Somali president Siad Barre in 1973 after putting the Somali elders behind his plan, and convinced the Somali President to do something about the Ogaden region. So Siad Barre gave Yusuf Dheere 2 years to give diplomacy a chance and to prepare the Somali National Army, for it was still unproven. In the meanwhile, Yusuf Dheere was told to recruit about 1500 volunteers and was permitted rations for only 1500 people; in the space of a month, he recruited over 3000 soldiers, most of them were old fighters from all over the country.

Two years after the initial meeting, and after going through the UN and unsuccessful peace meeting with Emperor Haile Selassie, Yusuf Dheere was given the go ahead he wanted and was told to get control of at least 60% of the Ogaden region before the Somali army would involve itself in the fighting. The WSLF found its opportunity when the Derg overthrew Haile Selassie in 1974, and switched from American support to the Soviet Union. Two years later, when the WSLF had control of most of the Ogaden, the first time since the Second World War that all Somalia was united with the exception of the NFD region in Kenya. The victory in Ogaden was mostly because of support from the Harari populace who had aligned with the WSLF and obtained high positions within the group.

The WSLF was supported in its rebellion by the Somali Abo Liberation Front (SALF), whose sphere of operations was in the provinces of Bale, Sidamo, and Arsi, where it advocated union with Somalia or the creation of an independent state. Somalia equipped both groups with Soviet arms, and in early 1977 sent 3,000 soldiers from the Somali Army to fight as guerrillas with the WSLF. Both groups also received aid and training from various Arab and socialist states, including Cuba.

Although the Ethiopian army outnumbered the Somalis by at least 3 to 1, the Somali army had much more air-superiority than the Ethiopians and was much better equipped. However, after massive Soviet support stopped and the United States did not accept the military support that Somalia had requested, the WSLF was forced later to retreat to camps in Somalia Proper after Soviet-supported and Cuban-armed Ethiopian and Cuban soldiers pushed back the WSLF and the Somali Army.

The Somali government subsequently forbade the WSLF and its leaders to use its territory to launch attacks into Ethiopia. By 1989 the WSLF had ceased to be an effective guerrilla organization within Ethiopia. Siad Barre's decision to restrict the WSLF, led to the exile of Yusuf Dheere in 1989 and to the formation of a WSLF splinter group, the Ogaden National Liberation Front (ONLF), whose headquarters were in Kuwait. Elements of the ONLF slipped back into the Ogaden in 1988, where they still operate. However, not everyone was happy with the ONLF because of its name (Ogaden rather than Somali), therefore many of the original WSLF supporters formed the United Western Somali Front which also includes some former ONLF members.

Afraad 
One of the major units of the WSLF was the Fourth Brigade known as "Afraad" which was composed of Isaaq officers. Afraad's initial objective was to liberate Somalis living in Somali Region of Ethiopia, but its focus later shifted due to increasing abuses against Isaaq civilian population perpetrated by WSLF. Killing, looting and rape of civilians by WSLF was common from 1978 onwards. This abuse was due to the Somali state employing the Ogadeni subsection of WSLF as a subsidiary militia that would be used to maintain control over the northern regions of Somalia. I. M. Lewis contextualises the period in which Afraad was formed as follows: The process of Daarood colonization of the north including seizure of property and economic favouritism at Isaaq expense, greatly intensified under Gani's brutal rule, with the systematic application of the apparatuses of state repression which increased in number and scope after the formation of the Isaaq-based Somali National Movement in April 1981Armed clashes between Afraad and the Ogaden forces of WSLF began shortly after 1979. An Isaaq army officer arrested 14 leading WSLF fighters who have been harassing and abusing the local population at Gobyar.

From February 1982, Isaaq army officers and fighters from the Fourth Brigade started moving into Ethiopia where they formed the nucleus of what would later become the Somali National Movement.

Notes
Source: U.S. Library of Congress

References

1970s in Somalia
1980s in Somalia
Factions of the Ethiopian Civil War
National liberation movements in Africa
History of Ethiopia
Paramilitary organisations based in Ethiopia
Rebel groups in Ethiopia
Separatism in Ethiopia
Somali nationalism
Ogaden War